John Bertil "Bebben" Johansson (22 March 1935 – 5 May 2021) was a Swedish football player who played as a striker, most notably for IFK Göteborg. He was also a football manager.

Career 
After starting his career playing for the local club Sävedalens IF, he joined IFK Göteborg in 1955 and won a Swedish Championship with the club. He won four caps for the Sweden national team between 1958 and 1963. He also represented the Sweden U21 and B teams.

After retiring as a player in 1968, he coached the team for two years and won another Swedish Championship.

In the wintertime, he played handball for Redbergslids IK.

Personal life 
Johansson died on 5 May 2021, at the age of 86.

Career statistics

Club

International

Honours

Player 
IFK Göteborg

 Allsvenskan; 1957–58

Individual

 Allsvenskan top scorer: 1957–58 (shared with Henry Källgren), 1961
 Kristallkulan: 1967

Manager 
IFK Göteborg

 Allsvenskan: 1969

References

External links

1935 births
2021 deaths
Footballers from Gothenburg
Swedish footballers
Association football forwards
Sweden international footballers
Allsvenskan players
IFK Göteborg players
Swedish football managers
IFK Göteborg managers
Swedish male handball players
Redbergslids IK players